At Turqi is a village in Makkah Province, in western Saudi Arabia.

See also 

 List of cities and towns in Saudi Arabia
 Regions of Saudi Arabia

References

Climate 
At Turqi has a desert climate, as a result, There is barely any rainfall during the year, to be exact,  there is about 5mm of rainfall a year.

Populated places in Mecca Province